Eino Tamberg's Concerto Grosso, Op. 5, was composed in 1956. It was awarded a gold medal at the 6th World Festival of Youth and Students the following year and was subsequently performed through both the Eastern and Western Blocs, launching the Estonian composer's career.

Tamberg's Concerto Grosso is scored for a wind quintet consisting of flute, clarinet, trumpet, alto saxophone and bassoon, piano, percussion and a string orchestra, and consists of three movements lasting ca. 25 minutes:

 Allegro moderato
 Adagio
 Allegro molto quasi toccata

A high-spirited neoclassical composition, it is representative of the mild modernism promoted by the Soviet regime though the Thaw after years of harsh artistic repression, and it is notable for its use of the saxophone, which had been banned in 1949 as a decadent instrument. Tamberg would use no less than three saxophones in his next composition, the Symphonic Dances.

Quotes

Sources
 Eino Tamberg: Joanna Tentata, Symphonic Dances, Concerto Grosso - Residentie Orkest, Neeme Järvi. BIS Records CD, 2010. Booklet notes by Merike Vaitmaa, pages 5–6.

Compositions by Eino Tamberg
Tamberg
Tamberg
1956 compositions
Neoclassicism (music)